The 1992 Kent State Golden Flashes football team was an American football team that represented Kent State University in the Mid-American Conference (MAC) during the 1992 NCAA Division I-A football season. In their second season under head coach Pete Cordelli, the Golden Flashes compiled a 2–9 record (2–7 against MAC opponents), finished in eighth place in the MAC, and were outscored by all opponents by a combined total of 301 to 133.

The team's statistical leaders included Troy Robinson with 422 rushing yards, Kevin Shuman with 1,518 passing yards, and Jimmie Woody with 714 receiving yards.

Schedule

References

Kent State
Kent State Golden Flashes football seasons
Kent State Golden Flashes football